Tiruvannamalai (Tamil: திருவண்ணாமலை), is a Hindu pilgrimage town in the south Indian state of Tamil Nadu. 

Tiruvannamalai may also refer to:
 Thiruvannamalai (film), a 2008 film
 Tiruvannamalai district, a district in Tamil Nadu
 Tiruvannamalai block, a revenue block
 Tiruvannamalai taluk, a taluk of Tiruvannamalai district
 Tiruvannamalai division, a revenue division
 Tiruvannamalai (Lok Sabha constituency), a Lok Sabha constituency in Tamil Nadu
 Tiruvannamalai (state assembly constituency), a state assembly constituency in Tiruvannamalai district of Tamil Nadu